This article is a list of historic places in Alberta's Rockies, including those in Banff National Park and Jasper National Park. It includes places entered on the Canadian Register of Historic Places, whether they are federal, provincial, or municipal.

List

See also 

 List of historic places in Alberta
 List of historic places in Calgary
 List of historic places in Edmonton

Rockies